Springfield is a 1996 album by Carole Fredericks. It features a cover of Edwin Hawkins’ "Oh Happy Day", the traditional "Silent Night", "You Had It Comin’", a duet with her brother blues musician Taj Mahal, and the pop single, "Run Away Love", which was the theme song to the 1998 Jean-Paul Belmondo film Une Chance Sur Deux.

The album was recorded in English and released in France, Belgium and Switzerland. The album was released in the United States in 2002. Springfield won Best Gospel Album, and singles from the album, "Shine" and "Save My Soul," took Best Gospel Song and Best Gospel Song 2nd Place in the 2004 JPF Music Awards. In the 2008 International Songwriting Competition, "Reason to Stay" won Honorable Mention in the Blues category, and "Shine" won Honorable Mention in the Gospel/Christian category.

Track listing
The album contains the following tracks:

All lyrics composed by Carole Fredericks; all music written by Erick Benzi; except where noted
 "Save My Soul"
 "Reachin’" (music: Jacques Veneruso)
 "You Had It Comin’" (music: Jacques Veneruso)
 "Shine"
 "Jesus in Me" (music: Jean-Jacques Goldman)
 "Run Away Love" (music: Gildas Arzel)
 "No Rain" (music: Christopher Satterfield)
 "Change" (music: Jean-Jacques Goldman)
 "Let Him Be Blues" (music: Jacques Veneruso)
 "Reason to Stay" (music: Gildas Arzel)
 "Tender Love" (music: Gildas Arzel)
 "Oh Happy Day" (Edwin Hawkins)
 "So I Pray" (Yvonne Jones)
 "Silent Night" (Traditional; arranged by Erick Benzi)

Personnel
The following personnel performed on the album:

 Carole Fredericks – vocals
 Taj Mahal – vocal, harmonica
 Charly Doll – drums, percussion
 David Bernadaux - drums
 Yannick Hardoium – bass
 Youssef Bouchou - bass
 Didier Mouret – organ, piano
 Jacques Veneruso – electric & acoustic guitar, dobro
 Gildas Arzel – electric & acoustic guitar, dobro
 Christopher Satterfield – guitars
 Bat’Brass – brass
 Thierry Durel – trombone
 Stéphane Baudet – trumpet, bugle
 Gilles Martin – alto, tenor and baritone saxophone
Yvonne Jones, Carole Fredericks, Catherine Russell, Erick Benzi, Jacques Veneruso, Jean-Jacques Goldman, Connie Malone - harmony vocals

References

1996 albums
Carole Fredericks albums
Albums produced by Erick Benzi